Flamenco jazz is a style mixing flamenco and jazz. As flamenco artists in the 1960s and 1970s such as Paco de Lucia and Camarón de la Isla started experimenting with traditional music they had learned in childhood, a nuevo flamenco ('new flamenco') evolved.

As more musicians round the world also experimented by mixing flamenco with other genres in the 1970s and 1980s, artists started recording predominantly instrumental albums full of impressive techniques, flamenco rhythms, and improvised solos over jazz chord sequences.

It is now common on online radio stations to have the option of choosing flamenco jazz as a style.

References
 https://www.npr.org/blogs/ablogsupreme/2011/10/13/141267715/flamenco-jazz-five-songs-where-andalusia-and-america-meet
 https://web.archive.org/web/20141016085133/https://www.flamenco-world.com/magazine/about/jazz_flamenco/jazz.htm
 http://rateyourmusic.com/genre/Flamenco+Jazz/

Flamenco_styles
Jazz genres